WIBD (1470 AM) is a radio station broadcasting a classic hits format. Licensed to West Bend, Wisconsin, United States, the station's coverage area consists of Milwaukee's northern suburbs.  The station is currently owned by David Magnum, through licensee Magnum Communications, Inc., and features hourly news updates from Westwood One.  Its studios and transmitter are in West Bend.

History
Prior to 1983, WBKV was a 1,000 watt daytime-only station. The station aired a local, full service format featuring local talk as well as lifestyle programming and some syndicated talk shows and music programming – 70s and big band music until around 2001.  At that time, it flipped to a satellite driven classic country format to complement sister WBWI-FM. The local morning show was retained; other shows were cancelled. Most of the dayparts during the classic country period were covered by Jones Radio Network's classic country feed. There were voicetracked breaks from local staff in afternoon drive during the week for a few years. The station flipped to News/Talk around March 15, 2013 and is branded as "LOCAL" news/talk. The station has a history of covering local high school sports – football, basketball, and baseball. It was an affiliate of the Wisconsin Badgers radio network prior to the flip to classic country.

On June 25, 2014, Bliss Communications announced that it would sell WBKV and WBWI-FM, along with sister stations WRJN and WEZY in Racine, to David Magnum's Magnum Communications, Inc. Bliss had owned WBKV and WBWI since 1970. The sale, at a price of $2.25 million, was consummated on October 31, 2014.

On February 7, 2015, WBKV changed their format to classic hits, branded as "Kool Variety 1470".

On October 28, 2016, WBKV changed their call letters to WIBD, adding a 190-watt FM translator at 101.3 FM.

Previous logo

References

External links

IBD
Radio stations established in 1950
1950 establishments in Wisconsin
Classic hits radio stations in the United States